Basketball was one of the 13 sports disciplines held in the 1970 Asian Games again in Bangkok, Thailand. South Korea got their first Asian basketball title by outlasting the defending champions Israel in the championship round. The games were held from December 10 to 19, 1970.

Medalists

Results

Preliminary round

Group A

Group B

Group C

Classification 7th–12th

Final round

Final standing

References
 Results

 
Basketball
1970
1970 in Asian basketball
International basketball competitions hosted by Thailand